Dame Constance Elizabeth D'Arcy  (1 June 1879 – 25 April 1950) was an Australian obstetrician and gynaecologist. She was the first woman to become Deputy Chancellor at the University of Sydney, serving from 1943 until 1946. In 1935, she was made a Dame of the Order of the British Empire (DBE).

Early life and education
D'Arcy was born on 1 June 1879 at Rylstone, New South Wales, the fifth daughter to parents Bridget ( Synnott) and Murtagh "Murty" D'Arcy, a police sergeant.  She attended Rylstone Public School and Riviere College, Woollahra.

D'Arcy completed a Bachelor of Medicine (BM) and Master of Surgery (CHM) at the University of Sydney in 1904 and went on to do her residency at the (Royal) Adelaide Hospital, because the teaching hospitals in Sydney did not accept women at the time.

Career
She became an honorary surgeon at the Royal Hospital for Women in Paddington and opened her own practice in Macquarie Street in 1908.

D'Arcy was a fellow of the Senate at the University of Sydney for thirty years from 1919–49. In this time she became the first female Deputy Chancellor at the university and served in this role during 1943–1946. She also an executive member of the Sydney University Women's Union, the Catholic University Women Graduates' Association and the Sydney University Women Graduates' Association.

At the Senate at the University of Sydney, she supported the proposal to make St Vincent's Hospital a teaching hospital and served as honorary gynaecologist from 1923–45.

In 1935, was invited to speak at the Australian Institute of Anatomy, Canberra. She spoke on maternal mortality, control of septicaemia and the rise in deaths from illegal operations but condemned any move to legalize abortion. In 1940, she was awarded the Pro Ecclesia et Pontifice.

Personal life and death
For many years, D'Arcy's two unmarried sisters kept house for her. She died of cerebrovascular disease at Sacred Heart Hospice for the Dying, Darlinghurst, on 25 April 1950. After the requiem Mass at St Mary's Cathedral, she was buried in Waverley Cemetery. To commemorate her service at the Royal Hospital for Women, a ward was named after her.

D'Arcy was an avid collector of jewellery — on emergency calls, the first task of the sister on duty was to lock it away.

D'Arcy Place in the Canberra suburb of Chifley is named in her honour.

Awards and honours
In 1935, she was made a Dame of the Order of the British Empire (DBE).

References

1879 births
1950 deaths
Australian gynaecologists
Australian women medical doctors
Australian medical doctors
Australian people of Irish descent
Australian Roman Catholics
Australian Dames Commander of the Order of the British Empire
Australian obstetricians
University of Sydney alumni
Medical doctors from Sydney
19th-century Australian women
20th-century Australian women